Gardim Khaneh (also Romanized as Gardīm Khāneh) is a village in Piran Rural District, in the Central District of Piranshahr County, West Azerbaijan Province, Iran. At the 2006 census, its population was 118, in 20 families.

References 

Populated places in Piranshahr County